The Bugatti Type 101 is a motor car made by Bugatti in 1951 and 1952 (one was built in 1965). In order to restart production after World War II and the deaths of Ettore Bugatti and his son Jean, the Type 101 was developed from the pre-war Type 57. Seven chassis were built; these were bodied by four different coachbuilders: , Guilloré, Antem and Ghia, the last to a design by Virgil Exner. The 101 was powered by the 3.3 L straight-8 from the Type 57.

Production
Six Type 101 chassis were built after an initial converted Type 57 chassis prototype. At least two more Type 57s were also converted to Type 101 specifications, making a total of nine Type 101 cars produced.

The last Type 101 was built in 1965 by Ghia designed by Virgil Exner for the last remaining Type 101 chassis. It was exhibited at the Turin Motor Show in an attempt to revive the marque, but financing could not be arranged and production plans were scrapped. Exner owned the car for many years, and it has lately appeared in public at the Pebble Beach Concours d'Elegance.

Engine

Notes

External links
 Bugatti Type 101 photos and information

101
Cars introduced in 1951